Paul Leo Henry Rodgers (born 6 October 1989), is an English semi-professional footballer who most recently played for Harlow Town, until the end of the 2018–19 season. Rodgers plays as a defender, either at centre half or full back.

Career
Born in Edmonton, Greater London, Rodgers joined Arsenal in 2005 and was given a professional contract at the start of the 2007–08 season. He originally started out as a full back but has since also played as a centre half and made his Arsenal first-team debut in a friendly against Barnet in the 2007 pre-season.

He made his competitive professional debut in Arsenal's League Cup quarter-final against Burnley on 2 December 2008, a match which Arsenal lost 2–0; Rodgers was substituted for Henri Lansbury after 46 minutes. On 22 January 2009, Arsenal announced he was to go on loan to Northampton Town for one month, which was later extended to the end of the season. Having been released by Arsenal in June 2009, Rodgers signed for Northampton Town after a trial.

Rodgers joined Newport County in 2011. On 12 May 2012 he was an unused substitute for Newport in the FA Trophy Final at Wembley Stadium which Newport lost 2–0 to York City. Rodgers was released by Newport in May 2012 at the end of his contract. Rodgers joined Billericay Town in 2012. In February 2013 he signed for them on contract, after a string of impressive performances.

In June 2013 Rodgers joined St Neots Town who play in the Southern Football League Premier Division. Following the release from the club in September 2013, he re-signed for Billericay Town. On 18 June 2014 he switched to Farnborough, before being sold to Bromley for an undisclosed fee in September 2014. He joined Bishop's Stortford in June 2016. In June 2017, Rodgers signed for Chelmsford City. He joined Kingstonian on loan in August 2017. In November 2017 the switch was made permanent.

Personal life
Rodgers is the cousin of Haringey Borough striker Joe Benjamin. They played together at Northampton Town, St Neots Town, Billericay Town, Farnborough and Bishop's Stortford.

References

External links
Paul Rodgers player profile at ntfc.co.uk

Defender Rodgers spent the formative years of his career at Arsenal and has signed for the Blues after spending last season at Newport County

1989 births
Footballers from Edmonton, London
Living people
Association football fullbacks
English footballers
Arsenal F.C. players
Billericay Town F.C. players
St Neots Town F.C. players
Northampton Town F.C. players
Newport County A.F.C. players
Farnborough F.C. players
Bromley F.C. players
Bishop's Stortford F.C. players
English Football League players
National League (English football) players
Southern Football League players
Chelmsford City F.C. players
Kingstonian F.C. players